The World Vitiligo Day, observed on June 25, is an initiative aimed to build global awareness about vitiligo. Vitiligo occurs in 1-2% of the population worldwide; a loss of color in the skin creating a variety of patterns on the skin from loss of pigment. Vitiligo is often called a disease instead of a disorder and that can have a significant negative social and/or psychological impact on patients, in part because of numerous misconceptions still present in large parts of the world.

The idea of a World Vitiligo Day was first nursed by Steve Haragadon, the founder of the Vitiligo Friends network, and then developed and finalized by Ogo Maduewesi, a Nigerian vitiligo patient who is the founder and Executive Director of the Vitiligo Support and Awareness Foundation (VITSAF). In her words, “World Vitiligo Day is a day to create extensive awareness on vitiligo and a day dedicated to all living with vitiligo globally”.
The first World Vitiligo Day (also defined as “Vitiligo Awareness Day” or “Vitiligo Purple Fun day”, from the color chosen as Vitiligo Awareness Color) was observed on June 25, 2011. The choice of June 25 as World Vitiligo Day is a memorial to musical artist Michael Jackson, who suffered from vitiligo from the early 1980s until his death, which occurred on June 25, 2009. 
The main event of the first World Vitiligo Day occurred at Silverbird Galleria's Artrum in Lagos, Nigeria, with the participation of several volunteers with different experiences (dermatologists, motivational speakers, dancers, artists, comedians, patients), united by the common will of spreading knowledge and awareness about vitiligo. Simultaneously, other events took place in other parts of the world, organized by local associations.

In 2012, Vitiligo Research Foundation (VRF), a non-profit organization aiming to fund and fast-track medical research, as well as connect investigators, care providers, patients and philanthropists, to accelerate vitiligo research and relieve the suffering of patients, registered the Web domain name 25june.org and joined VITSAF and cooperating organizations to increase the efficacy of their efforts in favor of global vitiligo awareness. A goal of the World Vitiligo Day 2012 was to raise 500,000 signatures to address the United Nations in order to:
 recognize this disease associated with severe social complications;
 recognize the desire to pursue multilateral efforts in therapy development and health-care education;
 designate June 25 as the World Vitiligo Day to be observed by the United Nations and Member States every year.

References

External links
 World Vitiligo Day, annual on 25 June
 The Vitiligo Friends network
 Vitiligo Support and Awareness Foundation (VITSAF)
 Association Française du Vitiligo

June observances
Vitiligo
Michael Jackson